Home and Community-Based Services waivers (HCBS waivers) or Section 1915(c) waivers, 42 U.S.C. Ch. 7, § 1396n §§ 1915(c), are a type of Medicaid waiver. HCBS waivers expand the types of settings in which people can receive comprehensive long-term care under Medicaid. Prior to the creation of HCBS waivers, comprehensive long-term care was available through Medicaid only in institutional settings. Under an HCBS waiver, states can use Medicaid funds to provide a broad array of non-medical services (excluding room and board) not otherwise covered by Medicaid, if those services allow recipients to receive care in community and residential settings as an alternative to institutionalization.

History
Section 1915(c) was an amendment to the Social Security Act created as a part of the Omnibus Budget Reconciliation Act of 1981. Adoption of HCBS waivers by states was initially slow, but Congress has enacted a series of reforms since 1981 to make the use of HCBS waivers less prohibitive. The Supreme Court case, Olmstead v. L.C. (1999), found unnecessary institutionalization to be a violation of the civil right established by the Americans with Disabilities Act of 1990 that service be provided in the least restrictive environment. Olmstead allowed that states could be in compliance with the Americans with Disabilities Act if they could demonstrate that they had a comprehensive, working plan to move people with disabilities into less restrictive settings.  This provision along with Centers for Medicare and Medicaid Services guidance on Olmstead compliance led to rapid adoption by the states of the HCBS waiver.

HCBS Settings rule 
The settings rule is a regulation that seeks to ensure the rights of people with disabilities receiving services through an HCBS waiver. This rule is written by the Centers for Medicare and Medicaid Services and will come into full effect March 17, 2023.

See also

 Medicaid waiver
 Olmstead v. L.C.
 Least restrictive environment
 Florida Medicaid waiver
 North Carolina's 1915(b)(c) Waiver Program
 Utah’s HCBS ID/RC Waiver

References

External links
 HCBS Advocacy – Information for advocates about the new home and community-based services rules

Disability law in the United States
Mental health law in the United States
Federal assistance in the United States
Medicare and Medicaid (United States)
1981 in law
Disability in the United States